Anton Pelchinger (died 18 September 1465) was a Bavarian Benedictine monk, artist and writer. He was born at Hofen, near Bad Aibling. He entered Tegernsee Abbey in 1442. There he served as Kapellmeister, chorister, organist and teacher of music. He also worked as a manuscript illustrator at Tegernsee and at Andechs Abbey. His illustrations are of high quality. In 1458 he went on a pilgrimage to the Holy Land, departing from Venice. He wrote a conventional description of Jerusalem and the Christian holy places. He does not include any personal details, but identifies himself as a professor of Tegernsee. One manuscript of this work is in the Austrian National Library in Vienna (no. 3012) and there may be another in the Bavarian State Library in Munich.

Notes

References

1465 deaths
People of medieval Bavaria
German Benedictines
Manuscript illuminators
Choristers
Holy Land travellers
German travel writers